K. Appavu Pillai (born 15 April 1911) is an Indian politician and former Member of the Legislative Assembly of Hosur. K. Appavu Pillai, popularly known as K.A.P, was an idealist and farsighted visionary in erstwhile Salem District and in Hosur town particularly. K. Appavu Pillai was elected as a Panchayat President, Hosur during the British regime (1943) for 30 long years till he breath his last on 1 October 1973. He won the 1957 State Assembly Election for Hosur Constituency and was instrumental in establishing SIPCOT in Hosur.

Born at Hosur in a middle-class family got educated in the District Board High School, Hosur, He rose to the position of a legislator, Managing Director Salem Central Co-op bank and Director - Dharmapuri central Co-op Bank.

Early life 

K. Appavu pillai is a Father of K. A. Manoharan.

Elections contested

Hosur Bus Stand named after K. Appavu Pillai 

In  1980s the  hosur bus stand was  named after K. Appavu Pillai, on the remembrance of his service towards Hosur town panchayat for more than 30 years. In 2007 the new integrated bus terminus was again named after him and inaugurated by M. K. Stalin on 18 July 2010.

Hosur Appavu Nagar 
Appavu Nagar is a Locality in Hosur town named after K. Appavu Pillai.

References

External links
 1967 Election Result

History of the Indian National Congress
Madras MLAs 1957–1962
1911 births
1973 deaths
People from Krishnagiri district
Indian National Congress politicians from Tamil Nadu